Mikaela Lupu (born September 16, 1995) is a Portuguese actress born in Moldova. She is best known for her roles as Teresa in the television telenovela Morangos com Açúcar and Sofia Fontes in the portuguese telenovela A Impostora,

Early life 
Mikaela Lupu was born in Moldova and moved to Portugal when she was five years old as her parents were hired to work as crane operators.

Career 
Lupu started her career in 2011 when she was selected to play the role of an anorexic girl called Teresa in Morangos com Açúcar. She played a character called Cila Medeiros, a drug dealer's girlfriend in Mundo ao Contrário in 2013. She plays the role of Maria in O Beijo do Escorpião and had small participation in the TV show Os Filhos do Rock.

Personal life 
In 2017, she publicly announced a relationship with Portuguese actor Nuno Lopes. They broke off their relationship a year later.

Filmography

Film

Television

Notes and references

External links 

1995 births
Living people
Moldovan emigrants to Portugal
Naturalised citizens of Portugal
Portuguese actresses
Portuguese television actresses
Portuguese people of Moldovan descent
21st-century Portuguese actresses